Garuda Wisnu Kencana Cultural Park, or GWK, is a tourist destination and attraction located at Ungasan, Badung on the island of Bali, Indonesia, about 10–15 minutes drive from Ngurah Rai International Airport. It is devoted to the Hindu god Vishnu, and his mount, Garuda, the mythical bird who became his companion.

Owned and managed by Alam Sutera Realty, Tbk, the construction of the  statue of Vishnu riding his mount Garuda was completed in August 2018.

Garuda Wisnu Kencana statue

Designed to be Indonesia’s tallest statue, Garuda Wisnu Kencana was inspired by a story from Hindu mythology about the search for Amrita (the elixir of life).
According to that, Garuda agreed to be ridden by Lord Visnu in return for the right to use the elixir to liberate his enslaved mother.

The idea for the monument was not without controversy, and religious authorities on the island complained that its massive size might disrupt the spiritual balance of the island, and that its commercial nature was inappropriate, but some groups approve of the project, because it will be a new tourist attraction on barren land.

The completed monument is about as tall as a 21-storey building. It weighs 4000 tonnes, making it the heaviest statue in the country. The statue is made of copper and brass sheeting, with a stainless steel frame and skeleton, as well as a steel and concrete core column. The outer covering measures  in area. The crown of Visnu is covered with golden mosaics and the statue has a dedicated lighting arrangement. The monument was completed on 31 July 2018 and inaugurated by Indonesian President Joko Widodo on 22 September 2018.

Multi role site
The site has hosted some large-scale and international events.
 On 20 February 2011, British heavy metal band Iron Maiden played the first rock concert at the venue in the Final Frontier Tour with tickets sold out to over 7,000 fans.
 On 17 August 2011, American rock band Paramore played the second date of their Pacific Rim Tour at the venue. This was also their last tour in 2011.
 On 25 July 2012, the Opening Banquet of the 60th World Convention of the Full Gospel Business Men's Fellowship International.
On 7, 8 and 9 December 2018, Djakarta Warehouse Project (DWP), the largest annual music festival of Electronic Dance Music in Asia, will be held here. To celebrate its one-decade anniversary, DWP ventured away for the first time from their usual city, Jakarta, and took the event to Bali.
 On 14 November 2022, during the G20 Bali summit, President Joko Widodo hosted the leaders of the G20 at the park's Lotus Pond area for the welcoming cultural dinner.

See also

List of tallest statues

References

Buildings and structures in Bali
Tourist attractions in Bali
Cultural centers in Indonesia
Amusement parks in Indonesia